BioMed Central (BMC) is a United Kingdom-based, for-profit scientific open access publisher that produces over 250 scientific journals. All its journals are published online only. BioMed Central describes itself as the first and largest open access science publisher. It was founded in 2000 and has been owned by Springer, now Springer Nature, since 2008.

History 
BioMed Central was founded in 2000 as part of the Current Science Group (now Science Navigation Group, SNG), a nursery of scientific publishing companies. SNG chairman Vitek Tracz developed the concept for the company after NIH director Harold Varmus's PubMed Central concept for open-access publishing was scaled back. The first director of the company was Jan Velterop. Chemistry Central was established in 2006 and the PhysMath Central journal imprint in 2007.

In 2002, the company introduced article processing charges, and these have since been the primary source of revenue. In 2007 Yale University Libraries stopped subsidizing BioMed Central article processing charges for Yale researchers.

In October 2008, it was announced that BioMed Central (along with Chemistry Central and PhysMath Central) had been acquired by Springer Science+Business Media, the second largest STM publisher. The Chemistry Central and PhysMath Central brands have since been retired.

In November 2008, BioMed Central became an official supporting organisation of Healthcare Information For All.

Following the merger of BMC into Springer Nature, BMC journals were gradually converted to the general Springer Nature software. The software migration meant the loss of several features, often related to open science requirements, like the ability to download a machine-readable version of the paper (in XML format), direct download of PDF files and the ability to read articles without cookies.

Journals 
BioMed Central's flagship journals include BMC Bioinformatics, BMC Biology, BMC Medicine, Genome Biology and Genome Medicine. It also produces the BMC Series of journals covering the fields of biology and medicine. Most of the other journals published by BioMed Central are owned and produced independently by societies and academic editorial boards, with BioMed Central providing the hosting, publishing platform and marketing.

All journals are published online; some of the flagship journals have in the past also been available as print subscriptions, such as Arthritis Research & Therapy. Publications in BioMed Central journals are, immediately upon publication, released under the Creative Commons "Attribution" license which grants permission to reuse publications and produce derivative work. The only exceptions to this (as of 2010) were the flagship journals, which reserved rights on review and commentary content; those articles were available to purchase on a subscription or on a pay-per-view basis, becoming freely available (but not fully open access) to all after six months; however, as of January 2015, "no subscription fees apply to these journals or to any articles published in them."

Open peer review
In 2001, BioMed Central was the first publisher to carry out open peer review as default, by openly posting named peer reviewer reports alongside published articles as part of a 'pre-publication history' for all medical journals in the BMC series. With currently 70 BMC journals operating fully open peer review.

BMC Series
The BMC Series is a collection of several dozen online research journals published by BioMed Central. Like all other BioMed Central journals, they have a policy of open access to the research articles they publish. Between them, they cover all major subject areas within biology and medicine. Two of the journals, BMC Biology and BMC Medicine, have a broad scope, and aim to publish particularly significant research. A third journal, BMC Research Notes, publishes scientifically valid research outputs that cannot be considered as full research or methodology articles across all scientific and clinical disciplines, while BMC Proceedings publishes conference proceedings. The other journals specialise on a particular subject area. Due to their free licensing, images from BMC journals can be reused in other places.

Most BMC Series journals have an impact factor. As of 2016, for the 53 journals with impact factors, BMC Biology had the highest at 7.98.

Databases
The company also has hosted biomedical databases, including the ISRCTN registry (previously Current Controlled Trials), a Primary Registry of clinical trials in the WHO Registry Network. The Biology Image Library and the Cases Database, a database of medical case reports, were closed in 2014. The company also provided hosting for institutional repositories of publications based on the DSpace platform under the brand Open Repository. The Open Repository activity was sold to Atmire in 2016.

See also
 Open Access Scholarly Publishers Association, of which BioMed Central is a founding member
 Trials (journal)

References

Further reading 

 
 
 
 Chillingworth, Mark (9 August 2004). "BioMed Central Seeks Open Access Advice." Information World Review.
 
  Accessed July 17, 2005.
 Galbraith, Kate (July 11, 2003). "British Researchers Get to Publish in 90 Online Medical Journals Free". The Chronicle of Higher Education 49 (44): A28.
 Gavaghan, Helen (June 30, 2003). "Open-Access Publishing Finds Official Favor". The Scientist. Accessed July 17, 2005.
 
 Loxton, Liz (May 1, 2003). "NHS Information Project Launched." Information World Review.

 MacLeod, Donald (June 17, 2003). "Publish and Be Free". The Guardian. Verified availability July 17, 2005.
 Peel, John (February 2000). "BioMed Central". D-Lib Magazine 6 (2). Accessed July 17, 2005.
 (September 3, 2001). "BioMed Central Launches 12 New Author-Initiated Research E-Journals". Information Today 18 (9): 24–25. Accessed July 17, 2005.
 Shearer, Kathleen (January 2002). "BioMed Central: An Alternative to Scholarly Publishing (CARL/ABRC Backgrounder Series No. 4)". Ottawa: Canadian Association of Research Libraries. Accessed July 17, 2005.
 Suber, Peter (September 6, 2001). "BioMed Central's Method of FOS" . Free Online Scholarship Newsletter.
 Watson, Linda A., Ivan S. Login, and Jeffrey M. Burns (2003). "Exploring New Ways to Publish: A Library-Faculty Partnership". Journal of the Medical Library Association 91 (2): 245–247. Accessed July 17, 2005.
 Young, Jeffrey R (January 18, 2002). "Publisher of Free Online Science Journal Charges Authors a "Processing Fee"". The Chronicle of Higher Education 48 (19): A36.

External links 

 

Academic publishing companies
Companies based in the London Borough of Camden
Digital media publishers of the United Kingdom
Open access publishers
Publishing companies established in 2000
Springer Science+Business Media imprints